Agway of DeWitt, New York, was an American agricultural business that offered feed for livestock and poultry, as well as seed, fertilizers, and herbicides.

History
Agway was formed on July 25, 1964, from a merger between the Grange League Federation of Ithaca, New York and the Eastern States Farmers' Exchange. In 1965, the Pennsylvania Farm Bureau Cooperative merged into Agway.

In 1980, Agway purchased dairy company HP Hood of Lynnfield, Massachusetts. It was sold to Catamount Dairy Holdings of Boston in 1996 as part of downsizing due to overall financial losses since 1990. Agway also owned a significant share of Curtice-Burns Foods of Rochester, New York, from 1966 to 1994, part of the holding company Pro-Fac Cooperative from nearby Pittsford, New York, which included the Birds Eye frozen foods brand.

In 1999, Agway sold or closed all its retail outlets and sold its warehouse system to Southern States Cooperative. On October 1, 2002, Agway filed for Chapter 11 bankruptcy. After the bankruptcy, the Agway brand name was owned by Southern States Cooperative.

On November 1, 2022, True Value acquired the Agway Trademark from Agway Farm & Home Supply.

References

External links

Agway Lawn & Garden Tractors by Murray

Intensive farming
Agriculture companies established in 1964
DeWitt, New York
Companies that filed for Chapter 11 bankruptcy in 2002
Farm and ranch supply stores of the United States
1964 establishments in New York (state)